The 2008 Big 12 Conference women's basketball championship, known for sponsorship reasons as the 2008 Phillips 66 Big 12 Women's Basketball Championship, is the 2008 edition of the Big 12 Conference's championship tournament.  The tournament was held at the Municipal Auditorium in Kansas City, Missouri between March 11–13 and on March 15, 2008.  Texas A&M University won their first Big 12 Conference women's basketball tournament championship beating Oklahoma State University, 64–59.

Kansas City-based Metro Sports televised the first round of the tournament while Fox Sports Net televised the second, semifinal, and final round of the tournament.

Seeding

Schedule

Tournament bracket

All-Tournament Team
Most Outstanding Player – Takia Starks, Texas A&M

See also
2008 Big 12 Conference men's basketball tournament
2008 NCAA Women's Division I Basketball Tournament
2007–08 NCAA Division I women's basketball rankings

External links
Official Big 12 Tournament bracket

References

Big 12 Conference women's basketball tournament
Tournament
Big 12 Conference women's basketball tournament
Big 12 Conference women's basketball tournament